( "sea" +  "steam";{{Refn|Glossed as:"".}} "sea-reek"; "sea-steamer") is a sea creature, purported to inhabit Iceland's waters (Greenland Sea) and southward towards Helluland. Although it was thought to be a sea monster, research suggests that the stories originated from a specialised feeding technique among whales known as trap-feeding.

The hafgufa is mentioned in the mid-13th century Norwegian tract called the Konungs skuggsjá ("King's Mirror"). Later recensions of Örvar-Odds saga feature hafgufa and lyngbakr as similar but distinct creatures.

According to the Norwegian didactic work, this creature uses its own vomit like chumming bait to gather prey fish. In the Fornaldarsaga, the hafgufa is reputed to consume even whales or ships and men, though Oddr's ship merely sailed through its jaws above water, which appeared to be nothing more than rocks.

 Nomenclature 

In the Snorra Edda, the hafgufa ("sea-steamer") appears in the list (þulur) of whales. The spelling is also  in some copies.

This was rendered "hafgufa ('[mermaid]')" in a recent excerpt of this work, but has been translated 'kraken' in the past. It was translated as "sea-reek" in the saga.

 Norwegian King's Mirror 
In the Speculum regale (aka Konungs skuggsjá, the "King's Mirror"), an Old Norwegian philosophical didactic work written in the mid-13th century, the King told his son of several whales that inhabit the Icelandic seas, concluding with a description of a large whale that he himself feared, but he doubted anyone would believe him about without seeing it. He described the hafgufa as a massive fish that looked more like an island than like a living thing. The King noted that hafgufa was rarely seen, but always seen in the same two places. He concluded there must be only two of them and that they must be infertile, otherwise the seas would be full of them.

The King described the feeding manner of hafgufa: The fish would belch, which would expel so much food that it would attract all the nearby fish. Once a large number had crowded into its mouth and belly, it would close its mouth and devour them all at once.

Its mention in the Speculum regale was noted by Olaus Wormiaus (Ole Worm) in his posthumous Museum Wormianum (1654) and by another Dane, Thomas Bartholin the senior (1657). Ole Worm classed it as the 22nd type of Cetus, as did Bartholin, but one difference was that Ole Worm's book printed the entry with the skewed spelling hafgufe.

 Odd's saga  
In the later version of Örvar-Odds saga dating to the late 14th century, hafgufa is described as the largest sea monster of all, which fed on whales, ships, men, and anything it could catch, according to the deck officer Vignir Oddsson who knew the lore. He said it lived underwater, but reared its snout ("mouth and nostrils") above water for a duration until the tide changed, and that it was the nostril and lower jaw which they had sailed in-between, although they mistook these for two massive rocks rising from the sea.

Örvar-Oddr and his crew, who started from the Greenland Sea were sailing along the coast south and westward, towards a fjord called Skuggi on Helluland (also given by the English-translated name of "Slabland"), and it is on the way there that they encountered two monsters, the hafgufa ('sea-reek') and lyngbakr ('heather-back').

 Original sea monster and analogues 

The aspidochelone of the Physiologus is identified as the potential source for the hafgufa lore.

Although the original aspidochelone was a turtle-island of warmer waters, this was reinvented as a type of whale named aspedo in the Icelandic Physiologus (fragment B, No. 8). In the Icelandic aspedo was described as a whale being mistaken for an island, and as opening its mouth to issue a perfume of sorts to attract prey.  observed that these were represented as two distinct illustrations in the Icelandic copy; he further theorized that this led to the mistaken notion of separate creatures called hafgufa and lyngbakr in existence, as occurs in the saga.

Contrary to the saga, Danish physician Thomas Bartholin in his Historiarum anatomicarum IV (1657) stated that the hafgufa ('sea vapor') was synonymous with 'lyngbak' ([sic.], 'back like Erica plants'). He added that it was on the back of this beast that St. Brendan read his Mass, causing the island to sink after their departure. The Icelander Jón Guðmundsson (d. 1658)'s Natural History of Iceland also equated the lyngbakr and hafgufa with the beast mistaken for an island in St. Brendan's voyage. The island-like creature is indeed told of in the legend of Brendan's voyage, though the giant fish is named Jasconius/Jaskonius.

Hans Egede writing on the kracken (kraken) of Norway equates it with the Icelandic hafgufa, though has heard little on the latter. and later, the non-native Moravian cleric 's History of Greenland (1765, in German) treated hafgafa as synonymous with the krake[n] in the Norwegian tongue., Blackwood’s Edinburgh Magazine, p.649 However, Finnur Jónsson for instance has  expressed skepticism towards the notion which developed that the krake had its origins in the hafgufa''.

In 2023, scientists reported observed behaviour of whales resembling that of the Hafgufa of legends, by staying stationary on the sea surface with their jaws open and waiting for fish to swim into mouths. The whale may also use chewed up fish to attract more fish. The scientists noted that the earliest description of Hafgufa described it as a type of whale, and proposed that this behaviour of whale as the origin of the Hafgufa myth which became more fantastic in later centuries.

Explanatory notes

References 
Citations

Bibliography

 

  

 

 ; 1959 ed. 2 286–280, e-text@snerpa

 
 

 

 

 

 

 

Mythological aquatic creatures
Creatures in Norse mythology
Sea monsters
Canadian legendary creatures
Scandinavian legendary creatures